"Don't Believe" is a song by German artist Mehrzad Marashi, the winner of the seventh season of Deutschland sucht den Superstar (DSDS, "Germany Seeks a Superstar"). It was written and produced by Dieter Bohlen. In April 2010 it was released as a 2-track single.

Formats and track listings 
2-Track Single
 "Don't Believe" (Single Version) 3:01
 "Don't Believe" (Karaoke Version) 3:01

Music video 

The music video was filmed April 2010 in New York City, which lasted one week. The world premiere of the video was on "BILD.de" and at the official website of RTL. In the video, Marashi performed at different locations in New York; in the video viewers can see the Statue of Liberty, the Skyline and Rodeo Drive. The "Don't Believe" music video was the most-viewed video on MTV.de and VIVA.tv for two weeks.

Chart performance 
The first time in the history of the DSDS TV series, the song was available directly after the program to download, and sold within the first 24 hours more often than any song previously. The Maxi-CD was an instant top seller: after only five days. The Dieter Bohlen written and produced song in Germany alone found more than 100,000 buyers and ranked according to the first week unchallenged at the top of the singles charts in Germany, Austria, Switzerland and Luxemburg. At the same time, a boycott campaign was launched, to prevent Mehrzad from reaching #1 on the charts, by downloading the 1996 song "Boomerang" by Blümchen, but without success.
Up to May 2011, it was the last single in Germany that debuted directly at No. 1. Then, Pietro Lombardi, the winner of the 8th season of Deutschland sucht den Superstar, would break the chain and also debuted at No. 1 with his winning title "Call My Name".

"Don't Believe" was certified with Gold in Germany.

Charts

Weekly charts

Year-end charts

References

2010 singles
Number-one singles in Austria
Number-one singles in Germany
Number-one singles in Switzerland
Pop ballads
2010 songs
Songs written by Dieter Bohlen
Song recordings produced by Dieter Bohlen
Sony BMG singles